"Nocturnal" is a song by English electronic music duo Disclosure, with featured vocals by Canadian singer the Weeknd. The song was released as the fifth and final single from the duo's second studio album, Caracal, on 16 February 2016. The song peaked at number 103 on the UK Singles Chart, number 179 on the French Singles Chart, and number 16 on the Billboard Hot Dance/Electronic Songs chart.

Track listing

Charts

Release history

References

External links
 

2015 songs
2016 singles
Disclosure (band) songs
The Weeknd songs
Songs written by Jimmy Napes
Songs written by the Weeknd
Songs written by Guy Lawrence
Songs written by Howard Lawrence
Island Records singles